Symphoria is a musician-led co-operative orchestra in Syracuse, New York, founded in 2012.

History 

The former Syracuse Symphony Orchestra filed for chapter 7 bankruptcy in 2011.
Symphoria was launched as a 501(c)(3) nonprofit in 2012 as a musician-led cooperative.

The orchestra launched for the 2022-23 season with a return to in-person concerts.

References 

Culture of Syracuse, New York
Musical groups established in 2013
Orchestras based in New York (state)